The Asia/Oceania Zone is one of three zones of regional Davis Cup competition in 2008.

Group I

Group II

Lebanon and Pacific Oceania relegated to Group III in 2009.
China promoted to Group I in 2009.

Group III
Venue: Enghelab Sports Complex, Tehran, Iran (clay)
Date: 9–13 April

Top two teams advance to 1st–4th Play-off, bottom two teams advance to 5th–8th Play-off. Scores in italics carried over from pools.

Pakistan and Malaysia promoted to Group II in 2009.
Vietnam and United Arab Emirates relegated to Group IV in 2009.

Group IV
Venue: National Tennis Centre, Bandar Seri Begawan, Brunei (hard)
Date: 9–13 April

Singapore and Saudi Arabia promoted to Group III in 2009.

See also
Davis Cup structure

 
Asia Oceania
Davis Cup Asia/Oceania Zone